This is a list of Honest Trailers episodes which have been published on YouTube by Screen Junkies. The series, created in 2012, consists of parodic movie trailers. It has been viewed more than 300 million times.

Created by Andy Signore and Brett Weiner, Honest Trailers debuted in February 2012 and by June 2014 had become the source of over 300 million views on the Screen Junkies YouTube channel. The series started when the creators learned that Star Wars: Episode I – The Phantom Menace would be re-released in 3D and decided to make a parody trailer for it, starting the series as a result of the positive reception the videos received. In 2014, a sister series of Honest Game Trailers began to be published on Smosh Games, with Jon Bailey serving as narrator for both series. Following Screen Junkies acquisition by Fandom, Honest Game Trailers left Smosh Games and moved to the Fandom Games YouTube channel.

Episodes

2012

2013

2014

2015

2016

2017

2018

2019

2020

2021

2022

2023

References

External links
 Honest Trailers YouTube Playlist

Lists of American comedy television series episodes
Videographies of YouTubers